Ayyampettai is a panchayat town in Thanjavur district  in the state of Tamil Nadu, India. It is located 15 km from Thanjavur and 24 km from Kumbakonam.

Chakkarappalli, Pasupathikovil, Valuthoor, Vadakumangudi, Pattukudi, Illuppakkorai villages are near to this town. Roadways are the major means of transportation, while the town also has rail connectivity in between Thiruchirapalli - Mayiladuthurai via Thanjavur and Kumbakonam. The nearest airport is Tiruchirapalli International Airport, located 64.3 km  (39.9 miles) away from the town. The nearest seaport is Karaikal Port, which is 81.1 km (50.3 miles) away from Ayyampettai.

Geography
It has an average elevation of 116 feet.

Demographics
 
Ayyampettai Town Panchayat has a population of 16,263 of which 7,593 are males while 8,670 are females as per report released by Census India 2011. 
Population of Children with age of 0-6 is 1767 which is 10.87% of total population of Ayyampettai (TP). In Ayyampettai Town Panchayat, Female Sex Ratio is of 1142 against state average of 996. Moreover, Child Sex Ratio in Ayyampettai is around 1001 compared to Tamil Nadu state average of 943. Literacy rate of Ayyampettai city is 89.02% higher than state average of 80.09%. In Ayyampettai, Male literacy is around 93.32% while female literacy rate is 85.31%.

Politics

State Assembly Constituency
Ayyampettai is the part of Papanasam State Assembly Constituency

Lok sabha Constituency
Ayyampettai is the part of Mayiladuthurai Lok sabha Constituency

Transport

Bus Stand
Ayyampettai Bus stand is located near by the Government Higher secondary school Ayyampettai. Ayyampettai is well connected with roads between the Highway of Thanjavur - Kumbakonam. All sorts of Buses provide service here.

Railway Station
Ayyampettai railway station is located towards Aaharamangudi Road near from Anjuman mosque. The nearest Railway station is ayyampettai and Pasupathikovil.

Education

Schools
Government Higher secondary school
Al-Mubeen Matriculation higher secondary school
Star Lions Matriculation higher secondary school
Anjuman Matriculation higher secondary school
Modern School
S.I.B.M.S. Higher secondary school, Valuthoor
St.Mary's matriculation school, pasupathikovil
Alif Matriculation School, Valuthoor

References

Cities and towns in Thanjavur district